Box of Fire is a box set album with all 12 single-disc albums released by Aerosmith under their first contract with Columbia Records. Additionally, the set includes a 20 minute bonus disc of previously unreleased recordings. Box of Fire was released in 1994.

Track listing

Aerosmith (Disc 1)

Get Your Wings (Disc 2)

Toys in the Attic (Disc 3)

Rocks (Disc 4)

Draw the Line (Disc 5)

Live! Bootleg (Disc 6)

Night in the Ruts (Disc 7)

Greatest Hits (Disc 8)

Rock in a Hard Place (Disc 9)

Classics Live! (Disc 10)

Classics Live! II (Disc 11)

Gems (Disc 12)

Box of Fire Bonus Disc (Disc 13)

Certification

Release history

References

External links

1994 compilation albums
Aerosmith compilation albums
Columbia Records compilation albums
Albums produced by Jack Douglas (record producer)
Albums produced by Tony Bongiovi
Albums produced by Bob Ezrin